Events in the year 1615 in Norway.

Incumbents
Monarch: Christian IV

Events

Arts and literature

Births

13 January - Henrik Bjelke, admiral (died 1683).

Probable
Lauritz Galtung, admiral and land owner (died 1661)

Deaths

See also

References